Trymbakgad Fort/Brahmagiri Fort is a fort located 30 km from Nashik, in Nashik district, of Maharashtra, India. This is an important fort in Nashik district. It is located on a hill adjoining the famous Trimbakeshwar temple.

History
This fort was built during Yadava period. It was under the control of brother of Ramchandra of Devgiri from 1271 to 1308. This fort was then under the control of Bahamani rulers followed by Nijamshah of Ahmednagar. Sahaji Bhosale rebelled against the Moghuls and captured many forts from Trymbak to Junnar in 1629. Sahaji was defeated and surrendered to Khanjamam at Mahuli fort in 1636 and this fort was surrendered to the Moghuls. In 1670 Peshwa Moropant Trimbak Pingle a chieftain of Maratha King Shivaji raje captured this fort. Moghul army tried to capture this fort after a long siege from 1682 to 1684. Finally, the fort was surrendered to Moghul. This fort was captured by Sahu Maharaj in 1691 and was under the control of Maratha empire till 1818 after which it was captured by the British army.

How to reach
The base village of the fort is Trymbakeshwar. There are good hotels in this town. The trekking path starts from the hillock south of the Trymbakehwar. The route is very safe and wide. It takes about an hour to reach the entrance gate of the fort. The night stay on the fort can be made in the temple on the fort.

Tourist spots
The Siddha cave and the place of origin of Godavari river are to be visited on the fort. This fort is joined to the Bhandardurg fort by a narrow natural bridge.

See also 

 List of forts in Maharashtra
 List of forts in India
 Trimbakeshwar Shiva Temple
 Marathi People
 List of Maratha dynasties and states
 Maratha War of Independence
 Battles involving the Maratha Empire
 Maratha Army
 Maratha titles
 Military history of India
 List of people involved in the Maratha Empire

References 

Buildings and structures of the Maratha Empire
Forts in Nashik district
16th-century forts in India
Tourist attractions in Nashik district